Aschisma kansanum is a species of moss in the family Pottiaceae. It is endemic to the United States.  Its natural habitat is temperate grassland. It is threatened by habitat loss.

References

Flora of the United States
Pottiaceae
Vulnerable plants
Taxonomy articles created by Polbot
Plants described in 1915